Ciqikou may refer to:

Ciqikou, Chongqing, subdistrict in Shapingba District, Chongqing, China
Ciqikou station (Chongqing Rail Transit), a station on the Chongqing Rail Transit
Ciqikou crosses, several East Syriac Christian crosses found in Ciqikou, Chongqing
Ciqikou, Beijing, area in Dongcheng District, Beijing, China
Ciqikou station (Beijing Subway), a station on the Beijing Subway